Labrum as a surname is either of Old English (pre 12th century) or of medieval French origin.  Variants can include:  Laban, Labern, Laboune, Labram, Layborn, Leban, Leeburne, or Leyban. 

English names are derived from the Yorkshire and Kent villages now spelt as Leyburn or Leybourne, derived from 'Ley' or 'Le' (clearing), and 'burn' (stream).  The name was originally recorded in the Pipe Rolls of Kent as Leburn. 

If the family origin is French, the name may derive from Le Bon - "the good", a nickname which may be complementary or imply the opposite of the literal translation.  The name could also be an adaption of the French name Lebrun, from the Old French 'brun' (brown), similar to the Old High German 'brun', with the addition of the definite article 'le'.  The usage may have been a nickname for someone who had brown hair, a brown complexion, or who wore brown clothing.  This name is associated with descendants of the Huguenots in the United States.

Surnames